Uğur Erdener (born June 15, 1950) is a Turkish physician specialized in ophthalmology and professor at the Hacettepe University, Ankara. He is currently a member of the International Olympic Committee and President of the National Olympic Committee of Turkey.

Early years
Uğur Erdener was born on 25 June 1950 in Trabzon. Upon completion of his elementary school education in Van, he attended the secondary school in Bandırma and graduated from the Gazi High School in Ankara. He enrolled in the School of Medicine of the Hacettepe University. After graduating with his medical degree in 1977, he completed a residency in Ophthalmology at Hacettepe University.

Career 
He served as the General Director of Hacettepe Hospitals between 2000–2007, and as the Rector of Hacettepe University between 2007–2011. He retired from Hacettepe University in 2017, due to the age limit. He has been the President of the World Archery Federation since 2005. As of 2011, he is the President of the Turkish National Olympic Committee. He is also the vice-president of the International Olympic Committee and the vice-president of the International Olympic Summer Sports Federation as of November 2017.

Family life
Uğur Erdener was married to Macide Erdener, a former archer and archery judge.
In his second marriage, he is with Zafer. He has three children and one grandchild.

References

1950 births
People from Trabzon
Living people
Hacettepe University alumni
Academic staff of Hacettepe University
Turkish ophthalmologists
Turkish surgeons
Rectors of universities and colleges in Turkey
Turkish referees and umpires
Archery in Turkey
International Olympic Committee members
World Anti-Doping Agency members